Roe is a masculine given name borne by the following people:

 Roe Conn (born 1964), American talk radio host
 Roe Ethridge (born 1969), American commercial and art photographer
 Roe Erister Rick Hall (1932–2018), American record producer, songwriter and musician
 Roe Messner (born 1935), American building contractor, husband of Tammy Faye Bakker

Masculine given names